Marcin Białobłocki (born 2 September 1983) is a Polish cyclist, who competed for primarily British teams professionally between 2011 and 2017. Having previously retired in 2019, Białobłocki rides for Polish amateur team Olsztyński Klub Sportowy "Warmia i Mazury".

Career

British domestic teams
He rejoined the Velosure team for the 2014 season, after his previous team –  – folded at the end of the 2013 season. In December 2014 he was announced as part of the inaugural squad for the  team for the 2015 season. He took part in the 2015 Tour de Pologne as a member of the Polish national team, where he won the race's final stage time trial.

Białobłocki became a well known name in the UK time trialling community riding for  when he took the 10 mile competition record from Alex Dowsett, with 16:36; making him the first rider to break 17 minutes. He then went on to take Dowsett's 25 mile competition record with a time of 44:04. This time was later improved on in 2018 when Białobłocki did a ride of 42:58 on the R25/3H course in Wales. In 2018 Białobłocki took the 50 mile competition record with a time of 1:30:31, three minutes faster than the previous record set only weeks before.

CCC–Sprandi–Polkowice (2017)
He joined the Polish team  in 2017, having ridden the previous two seasons for British team .

He was named in the start list for the 2017 Giro d'Italia.

Major results

2008
 6th Grand Prix of Wales
2009
 1st Severn Bridge Road Race
 1st Overall Girvan Three Day
2010
 3rd East Yorkshire Classic
 4th Overall Tour of the Reservoir
2011
 1st Stage 6 An Post Rás
 1st Jock Wadley Memorial
 2nd Overall Tour of the Reservoir
 2nd East Yorkshire Classic
 2nd Severn Bridge Road Race
 3rd Rutland–Melton CiCLE Classic
 8th Overall Cinturón a Mallorca
2012
 1st Round 8 - Torquay, Tour Series
 1st Severn Bridge Road Race
 2nd Lincoln Grand Prix
 2nd Jock Wadley Memorial
 3rd Newport Nocturne
 6th Overall An Post Rás
1st Stage 1
2013
 1st  Overall An Post Rás
 1st Perfs Pedal Race
 1st Circuit of the Fens
2014
 1st Cycle Wiltshire Grand Prix
 2nd Severn Bridge Road Race
 3rd Lincoln Grand Prix
 7th Overall An Post Rás
1st Stage 5
 10th Rutland–Melton CiCLE Classic
2015
 1st  Time trial, National Road Championships
 1st Primavera Road Race
 1st Betty Pharoah Memorial Legstretchers Road Race
 Tour Series
1st Round 8 - Croydon
1st Round 10 - Bath
 1st Stage 7 (ITT) Tour de Pologne
 1st Stage 2 Tour of the Reservoir
 2nd Chrono des Nations
 3rd Perfs Pedal Race
 5th Velothon Wales
 5th Severn Bridge Road Race
 6th Grand Prix des Marbriers
 6th Ryedale Grand Prix
 7th Overall Totnes-Vire Stage Race
 8th Overall Ronde van Midden-Nederland
 9th Time trial, UCI Road World Championships
 9th London Nocturne
2016
 1st  Sprints classification, Dubai Tour
 1st Stage 1 (TTT) Ronde van Midden-Nederland
 2nd Time trial, National Road Championships
 9th Time trial, UEC European Road Championships
2017
 1st Stage 1b (TTT) Settimana Internazionale di Coppi e Bartali
 2nd Time trial, National Road Championships
 8th Overall Dookoła Mazowsza
2018
 1st Welsh 25-Mile Time Trial Championships
 2nd Time trial, National Road Championships
2019
 3rd Time trial, National Road Championships
 British Record for 100 mile Time trial
2022
 5th Time trial, National Road Championships

Grand Tour general classification results timeline

References

External links

1983 births
Living people
Polish male cyclists
Sportspeople from Masovian Voivodeship
People from Mińsk County
Rás Tailteann winners